Authorized Bootleg: Live In Winterland, San Francisco, CA, 3/07/76 is a live concert recording of Lynyrd Skynyrd. It was released by Geffen Records alongside Live at the Cardiff Capitol Theatre which captures a concert four months earlier. This recording features the addition of synthesizers and backing Vocals. This concert took place in San Francisco, CA March 7, 1976.

Track listing
"Cry For The Bad Man" (Allen Collins, Gary Rossington, Ronnie Van Zant) – 5:41
"Saturday Night Special" (Ed King, Van Zant) – 5:35
"Searchin'" (Collins, VanZant) – 4:02
"I Got The Same Old Blues" (J.J. Cale) – 4:26
"Gimmie Back My Bullets" (Rossington, VanZant) – 4:13
"Tuesday's Gone" (Collins, VanZant) – 7:52
"The Needle And The Spoon" (Collins, VanZant) - 4:47
"Gimmie Three Steps/Call Me The Breeze" (Cale, Collins, VanZant) – 10:08
"Sweet Home Alabama" (King, Rossington, VanZant) – 7:13
"Free Bird" (Collins, VanZant) – 12:47

Personnel 
Lynyrd Skynyrd

Ronnie Van Zant – lead vocals
Allen Collins – guitars
Gary Rossington – guitars
Billy Powell – keyboards
Leon Wilkeson – bass, background vocals
Artimus Pyle – drums, percussion
The Honkettes - Background Vocals

References

Lynyrd Skynyrd live albums
1976 live albums
Geffen Records live albums